The Florida Cabinet is a body of the government of Florida comprising the attorney general, the commissioner of agriculture, and the chief financial officer that engages in the collective governance of the state.

History
Created following Reconstruction, when there had been a widespread distrust of the governors appointed by the federal government, the cabinet was originally designed to decentralize authority from the governor. Thus, until January 7, 2003, Florida was unique among states in that its cabinet consisted of six independently elected members who each held an equal vote with the state governor in executive decisions.  The original Cabinet positions were:
Attorney General
Commissioner of Agriculture
Commissioner of Education
Comptroller
Secretary of State
Treasurer/Insurance Commissioner/Fire Marshal

In 1998, Florida voters voted to amend the Florida Constitution to shrink the Cabinet to its current three members. This amendment took effect in 2003, following the 2002 election. Under the reforms adopted, the secretary of state and education commissioner became appointed officials under the governor who would oversee their respective agencies, while the positions of the comptroller and the treasurer/insurance commissioner/fire marshal were combined into the new position of the chief financial officer of Florida. The Cabinet also lost its control over the Florida Department of Education: management of K–12 education and community college education which was shifted to the new Florida Board of Education and management of the State University System of Florida to the new Florida Board of Governors. Some environmental policy powers of the Cabinet were shifted to other officials as well. The reforms were seen as ways to strengthen the power of the governor.

Composition
The meetings of the Cabinet are chaired by the governor, currently Ron DeSantis, and include these officers:

Chief Financial Officer Jimmy Patronis
Attorney General Ashley Moody
Commissioner of Agriculture Wilton Simpson

Each member is popularly elected statewide and carries one vote in executive decisions.  In the case of a tie, the vote cast by the governor decides the outcome.

Agencies
The governor and Cabinet serves as the board of directors of several state agencies and during their bi-weekly meetings discuss agency business and make policy decisions for the agencies.  The governor and Cabinet, all statewide officials, also oversee the separate offices and agencies under their departments.  The governor and Cabinet oversees the following agencies:

State Board of Executive Clemency 
State Board of Administration (excluding the commissioner of agriculture)
Division of Bond Finance 
Department of Veterans' Affairs 
Department of Highway Safety and Motor Vehicles 
Department of Law Enforcement
Department of Revenue 
Administration Commission
Florida Land and Water Adjudicatory Commission
Electrical Power Plant and Transmission Line Siting Board
The Board of Trustees Internal Improvement Trust Fund 
Financial Services Commission

Aides
The governor and each member of the Cabinet has an office dedicated to Cabinet affairs.  These offices are headed by a chief Cabinet aide, who is assisted by other aides.  The week prior to a Cabinet meeting, the Cabinet aides meet to discuss the agenda and to conduct preliminary discussions on a variety of issues slated to come before the full Cabinet.  Cabinet aides' meetings are considered an important part of the Cabinet process.

See also
Constitution of Florida
Florida Democratic Party
Governor of Florida
Republican Party of Florida

Notes

External links
Florida Cabinet

Government of Florida
United States state cabinets